IFK Arvidsjaur is a Swedish football club located in Arvidsjaur.

Background
IFK Arvidsjaur currently plays in Division 4 Norrbotten Södra which is the fifth tier of Swedish football. They play their home matches at the Ringelvallens IP in Arvidsjaur.

The club is affiliated to Norrbottens Fotbollförbund.

Season to season

In their most successful period IFK Arvidsjaur competed in the following divisions:

In recent seasons IFK Arvidsjaur have competed in the following divisions:

Footnotes

External links
 IFK Arvidsjaur – Official website
 IFK Arvidsjaur on Facebook

Sport in Norrbotten County
Football clubs in Norrbotten County
Idrottsföreningen Kamraterna